Mildred Fox (born 17 June 1971) is a former Irish Independent politician. She was a Teachta Dála (TD) for the Wicklow constituency from 1995 to 2007.

Private life
She was educated at St. Kilian's Community School in Bray and is a graduate of University College Dublin holding a BA degree. Before becoming a TD, she worked as a hotel manager. She is married with four children.

Political career
During the 1997–2002 Dáil she gained some notability as she, and other independent TDs, supported the government which otherwise would not have had an overall majority. Before and after this period she was little known outside Wicklow. She was also a member of Wicklow County Council from 1995 to 2003, when she vacated her seat in favour of her brother, Christopher, when the dual mandate ended.

She was first elected to the 27th Dáil at the Wicklow by-election in June 1995 following the death of her father, sitting independent TD Johnny Fox.  She was re-elected at the 1997 general election and again at the 2002 general election. On both occasions, she was the last candidate to reach the quota. In 2002 she was elected by an extremely narrow margin of 19 votes over the Labour Party candidate Nicky Kelly. She retired at the 2007 general election for "family reasons". Fox wished to spend more time with her children, telling The Irish Times in 2010 that "the family had to come first."

After retiring from politics, Fox started an ice cream business, and has volunteered at a local charity shop. She sings with the country band The Whipperwills.

References

 

1971 births
Living people
Alumni of University College Dublin
Local councillors in County Wicklow
Independent TDs
Irish Anglicans
Members of the 27th Dáil
Members of the 28th Dáil
Members of the 29th Dáil
20th-century women Teachtaí Dála
21st-century women Teachtaí Dála
People from Bray, County Wicklow
Politicians from County Wicklow